Bledzew  is a village and former town in Międzyrzecz County, Lubusz Voivodeship, in western Poland. It is the seat of the gmina (administrative district) called Gmina Bledzew.

Geography
The settlement lies on the western rim of the Greater Poland historic region on the left bank of the Obra river, a tributary of the Warta, and is surrounded by numerous lakes and extended forests. The village has a population of 1,300.

History

The settlement was established in the 1230s by the Piast duke Władysław Odonic, then ruling over the Polish duchy of Greater Poland. It became a border town after the adjacent Lubusz Land in the west had passed to the Margraves of Brandenburg in 1248 as part of their Neumark territories. In the early 14th century, the Ascanian margrave Waldemar occupied the Bledzew area and granted it to the Cistercian monks at Zemsko; it nevertheless was reconquered by the Polish king Władysław I the Elbow-high in 1326 and incorporated into the Poznań Voivodeship of the Polish Crown.

After the Cistercian monks moved their seat to Bledzew, the citizens were vested with town privileges according to Magdeburg law by King Casimir IV Jagiellon in 1458, confirmed by his successor John I Albert in 1493. In the course of the Second Partition of Poland in 1793, Bledzew was annexed by the Kingdom of Prussia and from 1815 incorporated into the Grand Duchy of Posen. The Cistercian abbey was secularised in 1835. After World War II with the implementation of the Oder-Neisse line it returned to the Republic of Poland and the remaining German population was expelled.

External links 
 Jewish Community in Bledzew on Virtual Shtetl
 Mühlenhamster - Bledzew -Tworzenie projektu z myślą o dzieciach - ein Projekt für Kinder entsteht...

References

Bledzew